The Butterflies is an American play. It was featured on Broadway in 1894 and starred Maude Adams.  Olive May was also in the cast.

History
It was written by Henry Guy Carleton. 
It opened on February 5, 1894 at Palmer's Theater in New York City.  It played for thirteen weeks, closing on May 5.  It toured Brooklyn, Philadelphia, and later San Francisco.

References

External links
 
 Bookmice.net

1894 plays
Broadway plays
Plays by Henry Guy Carleton